James Michael Thornton (born February 8, 1965) is a former professional American football player who played tight end for seven seasons for the Chicago Bears, the New York Jets, and the Houston Oilers. He was given the nickname of "RoboCop" because of his physique.  He played his high school career at Analy High School in Sebastopol, California.

References

External links
 NRL.com player page

1965 births
Living people
American football tight ends
Cal State Fullerton Titans football players
Chicago Bears players
Houston Oilers players
New York Jets players
Sportspeople from Santa Rosa, California
People from Sebastopol, California
Players of American football from California
Brian Piccolo Award winners